A light novel (Hepburn: raito noberu) is a style of young adult novel primarily targeting high school and middle school students. The term "light novel" is a wasei-eigo, or a Japanese term formed from words in the English language. Light novels are often called  or, in English, LN. The average length of a light novel is about 50,000 words, and is published in the bunkobon format (A6, 10.5 cm×14.8 cm or 4.1"x5.8"). Light novels are subject to dense publishing schedules, with new installments being published in 3–9-month intervals.

Light novels are commonly illustrated in a manga art style and are often adapted into manga and anime. While most light novels are published only as books, some have their chapters first serialized monthly in anthology magazines before being collected and compiled into book format, similar to how manga is published.

Details 
Light novels developed from pulp magazines. To please their audience, in the 1970s, most of the Japanese pulp magazines began to put illustrations at the beginning of each story and included articles about popular anime, movies and video games. The direction of light novels evolved to cater to newer generations of readers, with light novels becoming fully illustrated in the popular art style. The popular serials then began to be printed in their now known novel format.

Often light novels are chosen to be adapted into manga, anime, and live-action films. Some of them are serialized in literary magazines such as Faust, Gekkan Dragon Magazine, The Sneaker and Dengeki hp, or media franchise magazines like Comptiq and Dengeki G's Magazine.

Light novels have a reputation as being "mass-produced and disposable," an extreme example being Kazuma Kamachi who wrote one novel a month for two years straight, and the author turnover rate is very high. As such, publishing companies are constantly searching for new talent with annual contests, many of which earn the winner a cash prize and publication of their novel. The Dengeki Novel Prize is the largest, with over 6,500 submissions (2013) annually. They are all clearly labeled as "light novels" and are published as low-priced paperbacks. For example, the price for The Melancholy of Haruhi Suzumiya in Japan is ¥540 (including 5% tax), similar to the normal price for trade paperbacks—light novels and general literature—sold in Japan. In 2007 it was estimated (according to a website funded by the Japanese government) that the market for light novels was about ¥20 billion (US$170 million at the exchange rate at the time) and that about 30 million copies were published annually. Kadokawa Corporation's publishing subsidiary, which owns major labels like Kadokawa Sneaker Bunko and Dengeki Bunko, has a 70% to 80% share of the market. In 2009, light novels made ¥30.1 billion in sales, or about 20% of all sales of bunkobon format paperback books in Japan.

There are currently many licensed English translations of Japanese light novels available. These have generally been published in the physical dimensions of standard mass market paperbacks or similar to manga tankōbon, but starting in April 2007, Seven Seas Entertainment was the first English publisher to print light novels in their original Japanese bunkobon format. Other United States English-language publishers that license light novels are Tokyopop, Viz Media, DMP, Dark Horse, Yen Press (Kadokawa's American joint-venture with Hachette Book Group), and Del Rey Manga. The founder of Viz Media, Seiji Horibuchi, speculates that the US market for light novels will experience a similar increase in popularity as it has in the Japanese subculture once it becomes recognized by the consumer audience.

History
Popular literature has a long tradition in Japan. Even though cheap, pulp novels resembling light novels were present in Japan for years prior, the creation of Sonorama Bunko in 1975 is considered by some to be a symbolic beginning. Science fiction and horror writers like Hideyuki Kikuchi or Baku Yumemakura started their careers through such imprints. Another origin is the serialization of Record of Lodoss War in the magazine Comptiq. Kim Morrissy of Anime News Network reported that Keita Kamikita, the system operator of a science fiction and fantasy forum, is usually credited with coining the term "light novel" in 1990. After noticing that the science fiction and fantasy novels that had emerged in the 1980s were also attracting anime and manga fans because of their illustrations by famous manga artists, Kamikita avoided using terms like "young adult" because the novels did not appeal to one particular demographic.

The 1990s saw the smash-hit Slayers series which merged fantasy-RPG elements with comedy. Some years later MediaWorks founded a pop-lit imprint called Dengeki Bunko, which produces well-known light novel series to this day. The Boogiepop series was their first major hit which soon was animated and got many anime watchers interested in literature.

Dengeki Bunko writers continued to slowly gain attention until the small light novel world experienced a boom around 2006. After the huge success of the Haruhi Suzumiya series, the number of publishers and readers interested in light novels suddenly skyrocketed.

Light novels became an important part of the Japanese 2D culture in the late 2000s, with series such as A Certain Magical Index selling large amounts of copies with each volume release. The number of light novels series put out every year increases, usually illustrated by the most celebrated artists from pixiv and the most successful works are adapted into manga, anime, games and live-action movies.

Since the mid-2000s, it has become increasing popular for publishers to contact authors of web fiction on their blog or website to publish their work in print form. The material is often heavily edited and may even feature an altered story, which might compel someone who had already read it online to buy the print release as well. The free novel publication website Shōsetsuka ni Narō is a popular source for such material. Popular works like Sword Art Online, That Time I Got Reincarnated as a Slime, Overlord, Re:Zero and KonoSuba were originally popular web novels that got contacted by a publisher to distribute and publish those stories in print format.

In recent times, there has been a venture to publish more light novels in the United States. The leader of this publisher, Yen Press, is a joint venture between Hachette Book Group and Japanese publisher Kadokawa. Other publishers such as Seven Seas Entertainment, Viz Media (owned by Shogakukan and Shueisha), Vertical (owned by Kodansha USA), One Peace Books, J-Novel Club, Cross Infinite Worlds, Sol Press have all been making an effort to publish more light novels in English. Additionally, light novel authors and authors have been starting to make guest appearances overseas at anime conventions. At the 2019 Anime Expo, one of the biggest Anime conventions of the year, featured creators such as Kumo Kagyu, author of Goblin Slayer, and Fujino Omori, the author of Is It Wrong to Pick up Girls in a Dungeon?.

In these stories usually feature an ordinary person that is transported from a modern city life to a world of fantasy and adventure. Sword Art Online, a web novel initially published in 2002, contributed to the popularization of 'Isekai' as a genre. This web novel became extremely popular, forming various adaptations such as an anime, manga, and even various movies and spinoff series. Because of the success of Sword Art Online, other novels such as KonoSuba, Overlord and Re:Zero became increasingly more popular. The success of Sword Art Online and 'isekai' as a whole contributed to the creation of write-your-own fiction websites in Japan and increasing popularity of light novels in the west as well.

Outside Japan

In Taiwan and Hong Kong 
The Kadokawa Group's local subsidiary, Kadokawa Taiwan, translated and sold Chinese versions of their own light novels, after being established as the first overseas branch in 1999 by Kadokawa Japan. In 2007, Chingwin and Shueisha signed an exclusive contract to publish Super Dash Bunko and Cobalt Bunko under the name Elite Novels. Subsequently, GA Bunko and HJ Bunko, which were slowly starting to gain popularity in Japan, also signed exclusive contracts with local publishers. As time went on, the original exclusive contracts were gradually opened to other publishers.

See also

List of light novels
List of best-selling light novels
List of light novel labels
Cell phone novel
Illustrated fiction
Novel
Visual novel
Young adult fiction

References

External links
 

Anime and manga terminology
Japanese literature
Japanese popular culture
Young adult literature
Wasei-eigo